Sphinx pinastri, the pine hawk-moth, is a moth of the family Sphingidae. It is found in Palearctic realm and sometimes the Nearctic realm. This species has been found in Scotland but is usually found in England. The species was first described by Carl Linnaeus in his 1758 10th edition of Systema Naturae.

The larvae feed on Scots pine, Swiss pine, Siberian pine and Norway spruce.

Description
The wings of Sphinx pinastri are grey with black dashes. The moth flies from April to August depending on the location.

The back of the thorax is grey with two dark bands around both sides.

Life cycle
The females lay their eggs in groups of two or three along pine or spruce needles.

References

External links

"69.007 BF1978 Pine Hawk-moth Sphinx pinastri Linnaeus, 1758". UKMoths. Retrieved January 7, 2019.
"06834 Sphinx pinastri Linnaeus, 1758 - Kiefernschwärmer". Lepiforum e.V. Retrieved January 7, 2019.

Sphinx (genus)
Moths described in 1758
Moths of Europe
Moths of North America
Moths of Asia
Taxa named by Carl Linnaeus